Arne Hjersing (13 July 1860 – 17 December 1926) was a Norwegian painter.

He was born in Saltdal. He took his education at the Norwegian National Academy of Craft and Art Industry, at the Académie Julian and in Berlin. He made his debut exhibition at the annual National Autumn Exhibition of 1886, and participated regularly after that. His work is owned by the Oslo City Museum, among others.

References

19th-century Norwegian painters
20th-century Norwegian painters
Norwegian male painters
Oslo National Academy of the Arts alumni
Norwegian expatriates in France
Norwegian expatriates in Germany
1860 births
1926 deaths
People from Saltdal
19th-century Norwegian male artists
20th-century Norwegian male artists